The 1986 Tulsa Golden Hurricane football team represented the University of Tulsa as an independent during the 1986 NCAA Division I-A football season. In their first year under head coach Don Morton, the Golden Hurricane compiled a 7–4 record. The team's statistical leaders included quarterback Steve Gage with 1,090 passing yards, Derrick Ellison with 1,064 rushing yards, and Ronnie Kelly with 533 receiving yards.

Schedule

References

Tulsa
Tulsa Golden Hurricane football seasons
Tulsa Golden Hurricane football